The following is a timeline of the history of the city of Livorno in the Tuscany region of Italy.

Prior to 20th century

 1077 - Matilda of Tuscany tower built.
 1284 - Naval Battle of Meloria (1284) fought near Livorno with the win of Genoa.
 1303 -  built.
 1399 - Livorno sold by Pisa to the Visconti.
 1407 - Livorno becomes part of the Republic of Genoa.
 1421 - Livorno becomes part of the Republic of Florence.
 1423 -  (tower) built.
 1551 - Population: 749.
 1571 - Port of Livorno construction begins.
 1575 - Pisa-Livorno Navicelli channel created.
 1603 - Synagogue of Livorno built.
 1606
 Livorno attains city status.
  built.
 1626 - Monument of the Four Moors erected in the Piazza Micheli.
 1630 -  area development begins.
 1645 - Old English Cemetery, Livorno established (until 1838).
 1653 - 4 March: Naval battle fought near city during the First Anglo-Dutch War.
 1691 - Port declared Free port.
 1718 - Status as free port confirmed in the War of the Quadruple Alliance.
 1742 - Earthquake.(it)
 1796 - French forces enter city.
 1806 - Roman Catholic Diocese of Livorno established.
 1813 - Attempted siege of Livorno by British and Italian forces.
 1816 -  (library) founded.
 1825
  founded.
 "British 'factory'" closes.
 1840 - New  built.
 1842 -  built.
 1847 -  (theatre) opens.
 1848 - Cisternino di città built.
 1849 - May:  by Austrian forces during the First Italian War of Independence.
 1856 - Santa Maria del Soccorso, Livorno opened.
 1857 - June: Fire.
 1867 - Livorno–Rome railway opened.
 1868 - Livorno's free port status ends.
 1871 - Population: 97,096.
 1881 - Italian Naval Academy established.

20th century

 1901 - Population: 78,308.
 1911 - Population: 105,315.
 1915 - A.S. Livorno Calcio (football club) formed.
 1920 - Scuola Labronica artists' group formed.
 1921 - January:  held in Livorno.
 1935
  (railway) begins operating.
 Stadio Edda Ciano Mussolini (stadium) opens.
 1940 -  in World War II begins.
 1942 -  built.
 1943 - City bombed by allied forces in World War II; cathedral demolished.
 1944
 Bombing by allied forces.
  becomes mayor.
 1945 - Bombing of Livorno ends.
 1953 - Cathedral reconstructed.
 1954 -  becomes mayor.
 1962 - New Synagogue of Livorno built.
 1978 - Il Tirreno newspaper in publication.
 1985 - May:  held.
 1992 -  becomes mayor.

21st century
 2004 - Alessandro Cosimi becomes mayor. 
 2013 - Population: 156,998.
 2014 - Filippo Nogarin becomes mayor.
 2015 - Population: 159,431
 2015 - 31 May: Tuscan regional election, 2015 held.
 2019 - Luca Salvetti becomes mayor.

See also
  and Timeline (in Italian)
 List of mayors of Livorno
 History of Tuscany

Other cities in the macroregion of Central Italy:(it)
 Timeline of Ancona, Marche region
 Timeline of Arezzo, Tuscany region
 Timeline of Florence, Tuscany
 Timeline of Lucca, Tuscany
 Timeline of Perugia, Umbria region
 Timeline of Pisa, Tuscany
 Timeline of Pistoia, Tuscany
 Timeline of Prato, Tuscany
 Timeline of Rome, Lazio region
 Timeline of Siena, Tuscany

References

This article incorporates information from the Italian Wikipedia.

Bibliography

in English

in Italian

  1842-
 P. Volpi, Guida del Forestiere per la città e contorni di Livorno, 1846.
 
 P. Vigo, Livorno. Aspetti storici-artistici, Bergamo 1915.
 
 G. Nudi. Storia urbanistica di Livorno: Dalle origini al secolo XVI (Venice, 1959)
 L. Bortolotti. Livorno dal 1748 al 1958: Profilo storico-urbanistico (Florence, 1970)
 A. Melosi, Resistenza, dopoguerra e ricostruzione a Livorno. 1944/48, S. Giovanni in Persiceto (Bo) 1984.
 
 
 A. Santini, 400 anni di Livorno, Pisa 2006.
 A. Prosperi (a cura di), Livorno 1606–1806. Luogo di incontro tra popoli e culture, Torino, Allemandi, 2009.

External links

  (state archives)
 Items related to Livorno, various dates (via Europeana)
 Items related to Livorno, various dates (via Digital Public Library of America)

Livorno
Livorno
livorno